Marc Batta (born 1 November 1953) is a French former football referee.

Football career
Born in Marseille, Batta reached FIFA international status in 1990. He was namely in charge of the 1993–94 Coupe de France final, also directing the first leg of the 1996–97 UEFA Cup decisive match between FC Schalke 04 and Inter Milan.

In national team competitions, Batta was present at the UEFA Euro 1996 and the 1998 FIFA World Cup tournaments, refereeing two games in the latter. During the qualification group match between Germany and Portugal (1-1 draw), with Portugal leading after 71 minutes, Batta controversially sent off Rui Costa while he was being sub off. This directly led to Portugal failing  the qualification to the World Cup.

In July 2004 Batta succeeded Michel Vautrot as head of referees in the French Football Federation, remaining in the position for four years. On 1 August 2012, he took up the equivalent post with the Romanian Football Federation.

References

External links
Stats at Footballdatabase

1953 births
Living people
Sportspeople from Marseille
French football referees
UEFA Champions League referees
FIFA World Cup referees
1998 FIFA World Cup referees
French expatriate sportspeople in Romania
UEFA Euro 1996 referees